Casa Grande (O'odham: Wainom Wo:g) is a city in Pinal County, approximately halfway between Phoenix and Tucson in the U.S. state of Arizona. According to U.S. Census estimates, the population of the city is 55,653 as of 2020. It is named after the Casa Grande Ruins National Monument, which is actually located in Coolidge. "Casa Grande" is Spanish for "big house". Among resident English speakers, there is no consensus on how to pronounce the city's name.

History
Casa Grande was founded in 1879 by The Carter Family during the Arizona mining boom, specifically due to the presence of the Southern Pacific Railroad. In January 1880, the community of Terminus, meaning "end-of-the-line," was established despite consisting of just five residents and three buildings. In September 1880, railroad executives renamed the settlement Casa Grande, after the Hohokam ruins at the nearby Casa Grande Ruins National Monument. Casa Grande grew slowly, and suffered several setbacks both in 1886 and 1893, when fires ravaged the town, destroying all wooden housing structures within it. When the mining boom slowed in the 1890s, the town was nearly abandoned, but with the advent of agriculture, the town remained alive and well, and was eventually incorporated in 1915.

One of the founding fathers of Casa Grande was Thompson Rodney Peart. Peart Road, Peart Park, and the Peart Center, all of which are notable fixtures of Casa Grande, are named after him.

Casa Grande was home to a collective farm society which was part of the Farm Security Administration.

According to historian David Leighton, during World War II, from 1942 to 1945, a Japanese-American relocation camp was set up outside of Casa Grande, known as the Gila River War Relocation Center. Two notable people that were interned there were future actor Pat Morita and baseball player Kenichi Zenimura, who constructed a baseball field and set up a league in the relocation camp.

Casa Grande is home to Francisco Grande Hotel & Golf Resort, former spring training location for the San Francisco Giants. Then owner, Horace Stoneham, began developing the property in 1959. The first exhibition game was played in Casa Grande in 1961, with Willie Mays hitting a  home run. The San Francisco Giants no longer play at Francisco Grande, but the pool in a baseball bat and ball shape remains in memory of the past ballgames.

During the Cold War, Casa Grande was the location of the Casa Grande Photogrammetric Test Range. These targets consisted of concrete arrows located in and to the south of the city, which calibrated aerial cartographic cameras.

Casa Grande has also played a prominent role in semi-pro and collegiate baseball. The Casa Grande Cotton Kings, who were founded in 1948, qualified to play in the National Baseball Congress World Series ten straight times by winning Arizona state championships in the 1940s and 1950s, and were reactivated in the 2000s. They are now members of the Pacific Southwest Baseball League.

Geography

Climate
Casa Grande has a hot desert climate (Köppen climate classification BWh), typical for the Sonoran Desert. The city experiences long, extremely hot summers and brief winters consisting of mild afternoons and chilly evenings. The area averages only  of rain per year. Along with the rest of southern Arizona, the community is prone to dust storms and in the summer months is affected by the North American Monsoon, which brings high winds and heavy rain.

Demographics

As of the census of 2010, there were 48,571 people, 22,400 households, and 6,547 families residing in the city. The racial makeup of the city was 49.9% non-Hispanic White, 4.27% Black or African American, 4.91% Native American, 1.17% Asian, 0.10% Pacific Islander, 21.09% from other races, and 3.56% from two or more races. 39.13% of the population were Hispanic or Latino of any race.

There were 8,920 households, out of which 37.1% had children under the age of 18 living with them, 52.3% were married couples living together, 15.1% had a female householder with no husband present, and 26.6% were non-families. 21.7% of all households were made up of individuals, and 8.9% had someone living alone who was 65 years of age or older. The average household size was 2.80 and the average family size was 3.24.

In the city, the population was spread out, with 30.9% under the age of 18, 9.3% from 18 to 24, 26.4% from 25 to 44, 19.6% from 45 to 64, and 13.8% who were 65 years of age or older. The median age was 32 years. For every 100 females, there were 97.1 males. For every 100 females age 18 and over, there were 91.5 males.

The median income for a household in the city was $36,212, and the median income for a family was $40,827. Males had a median income of $34,858 versus $23,533 for females. The per capita income for the city was $15,917. About 12.4% of families and 16.0% of the population were below the poverty line, including 21.2% of those under age 18 and 12.3% of those age 65 or over.

Economy

The economy of Casa Grande was historically based on rural, agricultural industries, such as cotton and dairy farms. Over time, the city has become home to many Phoenix or Tucson urbanites who own homes in Casa Grande. Most residents either commute north to work in the Phoenix metropolitan area, or to the south, to work in Tucson. This trend has contributed to growth in the service industry of Casa Grande. Many new businesses such as restaurants, gas stations, and retail outlets are opening throughout the city in order to keep up with demand from the growing population.

A retail shopping mall operates in southern Casa Grande. Phase one of The Promenade at Casa Grande opened on November 16, 2007. Built by Westcor and the Pederson Group, it is similar to Desert Ridge Marketplace (an outdoor shopping center in northeast Phoenix). The Promenade at Casa Grande is an outdoor mall, built on a  patch of desert, and contains nearly a million square feet. An additional $11 million was spent by the city to fund the reconstruction of the Florence Blvd./I-10 freeway overpass.

Ehrmann Commonwealth Dairy operates a major dairy processing facility in the town that opened in 2013 and employs about 110 people.

Top Employers
According to Casa Grande's 2020 Comprehensive Annual Financial Report, the top employers in the city are:

Electric Cars
On November 29, 2016, officials from the state and the Lucid Motors car company announced a $700 million manufacturing plant will be constructed in Casa Grande that will employ up to 2,000 workers by 2022.

The LUCID Electric Car plant opened up for operation in November 2020.

News
 Casa Grande Valley Newspapers Inc.

Fire Department
The Casa Grande Fire Department (CGFD), ISO Class 2, provides fire protection and emergency medical services to the City of Casa Grande The Casa Grande Fire Department operates out of 4 Fire Stations and an Administrative Headquarters at the Public Safety Building.

CGFD is serving 109.65 square miles with over 60,000 residents.

Library
The Casa Grande Public Library provides the standard services of access to reading materials, as well as some special services, including a volunteer reading club for elementary school, internet access, and a talking book program. The Vista Grande Public Library, a branch of the Casa Grande Library System, opened in the summer of 2009.

City Court
The Casa Grande Municipal Court is the judicial branch of Casa Grande City government and accepted 6,609 filings, conducted 2,486 arraignments and held 156 civil, criminal and jury trials in Fiscal Year 2006–2007.

Notable people
 Eduardo C. Corral, award-winning poet and teacher
 Fred Enke, University of Arizona basketball, football and golf coach
 Fred Enke, Jr., professional football quarterback and cotton farmer
 Pablo Francisco, stand-up comedian
 Pedro E. Guerrero, photographer
 Joe Jonas, pop singer, musician, actor, and dancer
 Joy Oladokun, singer-songwriter
Lewis Storey, singer-songwriter 
 Michael Sullivan
 Alex Torres, guitarist

Education
The following schools are located in Casa Grande.

Public Elementary
 Cottonwood Elementary School
 Saguaro Elementary School
 Evergreen Elementary School
 Ironwood Elementary School
 Cholla Elementary School
 Palo Verde Elementary School
 Mesquite Elementary School
 Desert Willow Elementary School
 McCartney Ranch Elementary School
Public Middle School
 Casa Grande Middle School
 Cactus Middle School
 Villago Middle School

Public High School
 Casa Grande Union High School
 Desert Winds High School
 Vista Grande High School
Charter High School
 Pinnacle Charter High School
 Casa Verde High School
 ASU Preparatory Academy, Casa Grande
 Mission Heights Preparatory High School
 PPEP TEC High School
Charter Schools
 Grande Innovation Academy
 Legacy Traditional School
Private
 St Anthony of Padua Catholic School (Private)
 Logos Christian Academy (Private)
Colleges
 Central Arizona College
 Northern Arizona University (Extended Learning Campus)

Transportation
These highways serve Casa Grande.
  Interstate 8
  Interstate 10
  the proposed Interstate 11 would begin in Casa Grande and end in Las Vegas, Nevada
  Arizona State Route 287
  Arizona State Route 84
  Arizona State Route 387

The City of Coolidge operates Central Arizona Regional Transit (CART), which provides transportation between Florence, Coolidge, Central Arizona College and Casa Grande. Greyhound serves Casa Grande from a stop in Eloy.

The closest major airports to Casa Grande are Phoenix Sky Harbor International Airport and Tucson International Airport. Casa Grande Shuttle provides an airport shuttle to Sky Harbor.

See also

 List of historic properties in Casa Grande, Arizona
 Gila River Indian Community Emergency Medical Services

References

External links

 City of Casa Grande — Official site
 Casa Grande Valley Historical Society — Official site
 David Leighton, "Street Smarts: Miracle Mile went to 'Big House'," Arizona Daily Star, Feb. 3, 2015

 
Cities in Arizona
Phoenix metropolitan area
Cities in Pinal County, Arizona
Populated places established in 1879
Populated places in the Sonoran Desert
Mining communities in Arizona